On 11 December 2021, an explosion caused the collapse of four buildings in Ravanusa, Italy, killing nine people.

Explosion
During the late evening, a blast caused by a gas leak destroyed four residential buildings, causing their collapse. Three more buildings were damaged. During the immediate aftermath, eleven people were decleared missing. The next morning, three people were found dead, while two more were found injured. Four more were found dead under the rubbles two days after the collapse, and the other two were found dead three days after the collapse. Four of the victims were members of the same family. About 100 people were displaced due to the explosions. Residents said there had been a strong smell of gas for several days before the blast.

References

Building collapses in 2021
Building collapses in Europe
2021 disasters in Italy
Explosions in 2021
2021 in Italy
Building collapses caused by fire